The Death of Your Perfect World is the debut studio album by the American metalcore band Buried Alive. Produced by Steve Evetts, it was released on April 20, 1999 through Victory Records. It is the band's only album with Jesse Muscato.

Track listing

Personnel

Buried Alive
Scott Vogel – Lead vocals, 
Scott Sprigg – Lead guitar, backing vocals
Matt Roberts – Rhythm guitar 
Joe Orlando – Bass guitar
Jesse Muscato – Drums, percussion

Technical personnel
Steve Evetts – Producer, engineer
Mike Ski –  Layout, album design, cover photography
Rod Orchard & Jessica Cecere –  Live photo

References

1999 albums
Buried Alive (band) albums
Victory Records albums
Albums produced by Steve Evetts